St Margaret's College is an independent girls' school in Christchurch, New Zealand founded on Anglican Christian values. It offers the dual academic pathway of NCEA and International Baccalaureate.

History
The school was established in 1910 on the initiative of Bishop Julius of the Anglican Diocese of Christchurch, who invited the Kilburn, England-based Sisters of the Church Order to set up the school. The school was initially located in the Christchurch Central City south of Armagh Street, where it opened on 8 February 1910. In 1914, the school moved slightly north to Chester Street West off Cranmer Square, and that building is now part of the Cathedral Grammar School. St Margaret's opened a prep school on Papanui Road in the early 1920s, just north of the current school grounds. In the 1940s, the current grounds were occupied. On that site, the school had been using an 1880 homestead as a boarding house since 1922. In 1941, this building was renamed Kilburn House. In the 2011 Christchurch earthquake, Kilburn House was damaged. After NZ$2 million repairs, Kilburn House opened again in August 2012. The school received a commendation from the Christchurch Civic Trust for the renovation of this heritage building. This renovation was part of a significant rebuild project following the earthquakes when the school lost close to 90% of its buildings.

St Margaret's College today
St Margaret's College is the only girls' school in the South Island of New Zealand to offer the International Baccalaureate Diploma in addition to NCEA.

It is divided into three schools:

 Junior School (Years 1–6)
 Middle School (Years 7–10)
 Senior School (Years 11–13)

Boarding (Years 7–13) St Margaret's College has over 90 years of boarding history. Currently 150 girls are in three boarding houses, arranged in year groups and structured to the specific needs of each developmental stage.

Notable alumnae

Arihia Bennett, first female CEO of Te Rūnanga o Ngāi Tahu
Marjorie Chambers (1906–1989), senior nurse
Peri Drysdale (born 1954), founder of the Snowy Peak and Untouched World brands
Ella Greenslade (born 1997), rower
Anna Harrison (born 1983), Silver Ferns netballer
Olivia Loe (born 1992), rower
Ngaio Marsh (1895–1982), writer
Mary Ruddock (1895–1969), fashion designer and businesswoman
Amy Satterthwaite (born 1986), White Ferns cricketer
Julie Seymour (born 1971), Silver Ferns captain
Nicky Wagner (born 1953), former MP

See also
List of schools in New Zealand

References

External links
St Margaret's School Website

Educational institutions established in 1910
International Baccalaureate schools in New Zealand
Boarding schools in New Zealand
Girls' schools in New Zealand
Secondary schools in Christchurch
Anglican schools in New Zealand
1910 establishments in New Zealand
Alliance of Girls' Schools Australasia